David Allen Gall (December 17, 1941 – August 1, 2021) was a Thoroughbred horse racing Hall of Fame jockey, who ranked fifth in lifetime wins by North American jockeys and who was the first jockey in the United States to ride eight winners on a single racecard. Gall was born in Rose Valley, Saskatchewan.

Riding career
Gall began his career riding at tracks in  Regina, Saskatchewan, Edmonton and Calgary in Alberta, and Winnipeg, Manitoba before going to the Hastings Racecourse in Vancouver, British Columbia. He would follow the path of other Canadian jockeys like George Woolf and Johnny Longden and head south to tracks in California. Eventually he made his way to Illinois where, dubbed "The General" by fans and the media, he would dominate racing at Fairmount Park Racetrack and Cahokia Downs.

Achievements
During a 43-year career, Gall was a two-time winner of the United States national riding title, winning more races than any other rider in 1979 and 1981. On October 18, 1978, he won eight races on a single racecard at Cahokia Downs and won seven races on five occasions.

Honors
In 1993, Gall was inducted into the Canadian Horse Racing Hall of Fame. In 1996 he was the recipient of the Avelino Gomez Memorial Award, given annually to a jockey who is Canadian-born, Canadian-raised, or a regular in the country for more than five years, who has made significant contributions to the sport.

Gall retired from riding on September 18, 1999, ranked fourth all-time among jockeys for races won in the history of American Thoroughbred racing with 7,396 victories from 41,709 mounts. He has remained in the industry as a trainer/owner until retiring in 2011.

Death
Gall died on August 1, 2021, at his home in State College, Pennsylvania.

References

External links
National Museum of Racing and Hall of Fame list of All-Time North American Jockeys Ranked by Wins

1941 births
2021 deaths
Canadian jockeys
Canadian Horse Racing Hall of Fame inductees
Avelino Gomez Memorial Award winners
American jockeys
American Champion jockeys
American horse trainers
American racehorse owners and breeders
Canadian emigrants to the United States
Sportspeople from Saskatchewan